Seoul High School (Hangul: 서울고등학교) is a public high school located in Seocho-dong, the greater Gangnam area Seocho-gu, Seoul, South Korea. Seoul High School is a member school of Gangnam School District Eight (강남8학군).

History
The school was established at the site of Gyeonghuigung in 1946, moving to the current site (Seocho-dong) due to restoration of Gyeonghuigung. Named Kyung Sung Middle School during Japanese occupation.

History

Feb 1 1946	Inauguration of the first principal Kim, Won Kyu
Mar 5 1946	School opening ceremony and entrance ceremony (12 classes, 552 students)
June 1947	Named 'Seoul Public Middle School'
June 5, 1949	First graduation ceremony
Sep 1 1951	In accordance with the reform of educational system separated as Seoul High School (10th-12th grades)
Feb 28 1971	In accordance with the equalization of middle Schools, Seoul Middle School was closed after the twentieth graduation ceremony
July 3, 1971	Establishment of Inwang Scholarship Foundation
June 9, 1980	Moved to the present campus
Mar 1 1985	Expanded to 60 classes
Sep 1 2004	Inauguration of the twenty-third Principal Sung, Kee Won
Feb 3 2005	Held the fifty-seventh graduation ceremony (39,013 alumni in total)
Mar 1 2006	Decreased to 51 classes
Mar 1 2007	Inauguration of the 24th Principal Lee, Kyu Seok
Mar 1 2007     48 classes in total and a special class for the handicapped
Feb 1 2008	The 60th graduation ceremony (42,187 alumni in total)
Mar 1 2008	45 classes in total and a special class for the handicapped
Mar 1 2008     Inauguration of the 25th Principal Park, Hee-Song

Memorial facility
 Samil Pagoda: Built in celebration of the 41st anniversary of March 1st Movement
 Pochung Monument: Set up on June 15, 1956, in remembrance of Seoul High School students who sacrificed their lives for the Korean War or the April Revolution
 The Statue of Major Kang, Jae-gu: Set up on April 12, 1986, in honor of Major Kang, who sacrificed his life to save more than 100 subordinates on Oct 4, 1965, when one of his subordinates threw a hand grenade in the wrong direction by mistake during the military training for the Vietnamese War

Notable alumni

Academia
 Lee Soo-sung, former president of Seoul National University and prime minister of South Korea
 Park Se-il, former professor at Graduate School of International Studies, Seoul National University
 Song Ho-geun, professor at College of Social Science, Seoul National University
 Lee Young-soon, former dean of College of Veterinary Medicine, Seoul National University
 Rim Kwan, 2nd president of KAIST, later the chairman of its board of directors. President and later chairman of the Samsung Advanced Institute of Technology, Samsung's central R&D center. Chairman of the Sungkyunkwan University Foundation. Professor and Associate Dean at the University of Iowa College of Engineering, also founder of its Biomedical Engineering department.

Business
 Lim Chang-Wook, founder of Daesang Group
 Choi Ji-Sung, CEO of Samsung Electronics
 Yoon Se-young, Chairman of Seoul Broadcasting System
 Koo Chayol, CEO of LS Cable
 Chung Mong-won, CEO of Halla Group and Mando Corporation, IIHF Hall of Fame inductee
 Joo Gang-Soo, CEO of Korea Gas Corporation
 Lee Minjoo, founder of C&M Communications and Atinum Partners

Legal
 Kim Yong-Joon, former Chief Justice of Constitutional Court of Korea
 Yang Chang-Soo, Justice of Supreme Court of Korea and former professor at the law school of Seoul National University
 Song Gwang-Soo, former attorney general
 Shin Young-Moo, founding partner of Shin & Kim
 Lee Jae-Hoo, representative of Kim & Chang

Public service
 Yoon Jeung-Hyun, Minister of Strategy & Finance
 Lee Shi-Yoon, former Chairman of the Board of Audit and Inspection of Korea and professor at the law school of Seoul National University
 Won Se-Hoon, former chairman of National Intelligence Service
 Kim Myung-Ho, former chairman of Bank of Korea
 Jeon Yoon-Cheol, former chairman of Fair Trade Commission

Politics
 Cho Soon-hyung, assemblyman

Literature
 Choi In-ho, novelist
 Hwang Dong-gyu, poet

Sports
 Kim Dong-Soo, professional baseball player
 Lee Sang-Hoon, professional baseball player
 Kang Baek-Ho, professional baseball player

Culture
 Bae Chang-ho, film director
 Jang Sun-woo, film director
 Lee Soon-jae, actor and former assemblyman
 Yim Jae-beom, rock singer
 Kim Jong-jin, rock singer
 Joo Sang-wook, actor

See also
:Category:Seoul High School alumni

References

External links 
Seoul High School
Seoul High School Alumni

High schools in Seoul
Seocho District
Educational institutions established in 1946
1946 establishments in Korea
Boys' schools in South Korea